TechPresident is a nonpartisan political website founded by Andrew Rasiej and Micah Sifry with the idea of tracking how the Internet is impacting U.S. political campaigns. It was launched on February 12, 2007 to monitor the United States presidential election of 2008. The site follows how the campaigns are utilizing new Internet-based strategies and how citizens are creating content, such as YouTube videos and Facebook groups, using the social media technologies.

TechPresident is an extension of Personal Democracy Forum, an annual conference and online magazine which focuses on the broader topic of how technology is changing politics and advocacy.

References

External links
 

American political websites